A takeover is the purchase of one company by another.

Takeover or Take Over may also refer to:

Arts, entertainment, and media

Literature
Take Over (James Bond), an unpublished 1970 James Bond novel purportedly written by Ian Fleming
 The Takeover (novel), a 1976 novel by Muriel Spark

Music
The Takeover, a band which later became Innerpartysystem
Takeover Records, a punk rock record label
Take Over, a 2009 album by Aaron Shust
The Takeover (album), an album by Zion I
The Takeover, an album by Lil' Flip
"Take Over", a song by Nick Jonas from his self-titled album
 "Take Over", a 2020 promotional single for the 2020 League of Legends World Championship
"Takeover" (song), a 2001 song by rapper Jay-Z produced by Kanye West
"The Take Over", song by Four Year Strong from Rise or Die Trying

Other uses in arts, entertainment, and media
Takeover Entertainment
 NXT TakeOver, several events by WWE
Takeover Radio, a British radio station
 The Takeover (film), 1995
Takeover (1988 film), a 1988 Australian film
 Takeover a 2020 German film
Takeover (upcoming film), an upcoming American film

Other uses
Nick Schulman, known as Nick "The Takeover" Schulman, a poker player
Takeover, the occupation of a building or other site as a form of protest
IRC takeover, an acquisition of an Internet Relay Chat by an entity other than the channel's owner
A promotional tactic in social media where a popular figure has control over an outside social media account or channel for a certain period to promote their work
Sideshow, also known as a takeover or street takeover, is an informal demonstration of automotive stunts often held in vacant lots, and public intersections.

See also

 Regulatory capture, a government's policy takeover by non-government entity with a goal to suppress or change regulation beneficial to society's interests

Failover, a term used in information technology for a High Availability
Hijacking (disambiguation), various means of taking over a form of transportation
Hostile Takeover (disambiguation)
Taking Over (disambiguation)